The acronym WIMP is a solution stack of software, partially free and open source software, used to run dynamic Web sites on servers.  The expansion is as follows:

Windows, referring to the operating system;
IIS, the Web server;
MySQL, MS SQL Server or MS Access, the database management system (or database server);
PHP or others, e.g. the Perl, Python, PowerShell programming languages.

The Microsoft Web Platform Installer is a tool to install applications on a WIMP-system.

LAMP is a similar stack, of entirely free software with Linux replacing Windows, and Apache HTTP Server replacing IIS.

WAMP is a similar stack, with Apache replacing IIS.

See also
Microsoft Web Platform Installer

References

Web server software